Jemima Rebecca Redgrave (born 14 January 1965), known as Jemma Redgrave, is a British actress, and a member of the Redgrave family. She played the title character in four series of Bramwell, and has a recurring role in Doctor Who as Kate Stewart, Head of Scientific Research at UNIT. As well as a career in television, she has appeared in many stage productions and on film, including her portrayal of Evie Wilcox in the Merchant Ivory film Howards End.

Early life and family

Born in London on 14 January 1965, she is the daughter of actor Corin Redgrave and his first wife, Deirdre Hamilton-Hill, a former fashion model. They divorced when Jemma was nine. She has a brother, Luke Redgrave, who is a camera operator, and two half-brothers, Arden and Harvey Redgrave. Her mother died in 1997 and her father died in 2010.

She is the granddaughter of Sir Michael Redgrave and Rachel Kempson, niece of actresses Vanessa Redgrave and Lynn Redgrave, and cousin of Joely Richardson, Carlo Nero and Natasha Richardson. Her step-mother is the actress Kika Markham.

Career

Education

As a child, she attended the Godolphin and Latymer school in Hammersmith. She then enrolled at the London Academy of Music and Dramatic Art at the age of 18.

Stage

After graduation, Redgrave landed a succession of high-profile stage acting roles: in the 1988 stage production of Strindberg's Easter; in Lady Windermere's Fan in Belfast, Northern Ireland; as Emily in Thornton Wilder's Our Town; as Irina in a 1990 revival of Anton Chekhov's The Three Sisters in London's West End with her aunts Vanessa Redgrave and Lynn Redgrave; in 1993 with Colin Firth in Alexander Griboyedov's Chatsky at the Almeida Theatre, London; and in A Midsummer Night's Dream in 2001 at the Albery Theatre (now the Noël Coward Theatre), London, playing Titania alongside Dawn French as Bottom.

In 2010, she appeared in New York's Public Theater in The Great Game: Afghanistan which featured seven hours of on-stage acting. Redgrave appeared in four of the twelve plays. In 2012, Redgrave appeared alongside Ben Chaplin in Roger Michell's production of Farewell to the Theatre at the Hampstead Theatre, followed by starring roles in Donkeys' Years (2014) and An Ideal Husband (2016).

In 2018, Redgrave appeared in another Roger Michell production, appearing again alongside Ben Chaplin, this time in Joe Penhall's Mood Music at The Old Vic.

Television

She has appeared in many roles on British television, including leading actor roles as the eponymous Dr. Eleanor Bramwell in four series of ITV's Bramwell and as D.S. Eve Granger in Cold Blood, alongside John Hannah and Matthew Kelly. Redgrave also appeared as Eleanor in Roger Michell's The Buddha of Suburbia: a four-part adaptation of the ground-breaking novel of the same name by Hanif Kureishi and with a soundtrack written and performed specifically for the production by David Bowie.

Other prominent roles have included Francesca Rochester in Judge John Deed and Dee Stanton in Like Father, Like Son. In 2007, she portrayed Lady Bertram in Mansfield Park and Sophie Wall in Waking the Dead, followed by a 2009 appearance in the series, Unforgiven, written by Sally Wainwright. In 2013, she also appeared as Doctor Zoe Evans in the BBC One drama series Frankie.

From 2016 to 2018, Redgrave played former RAMC surgeon, Major Berenice Wolfe, in the popular BBC medical drama Holby City. In 2019, she joined the cast of ITV's Grantchester as Amelia, the mother of the show's lead character, Rev. Will Davenport.

On 31 August 2021, she made a surprise return to Holby City as Bernie Wolfe.

Doctor Who
In 2012, Redgrave was cast in the long-running science-fiction programme Doctor Who as Kate Stewart, the daughter of The Brigadier, a recurring character from the series' classic run. First appearing in "The Power of Three" (2012) with Matt Smith's Eleventh Doctor, Kate is the head of Scientific Research and de facto leader of fictional military organisation UNIT, a role previously occupied by her father before his retirement. Redgrave reprises the role in the fiftieth anniversary special "The Day of the Doctor" (2013), which was simulcast on television and in cinemas across the world in 94 countries, earning a Guinness World Record for the world's largest ever simulcast of a TV drama.

Redgrave later portrayed Kate alongside Peter Capaldi’s Twelfth Doctor in the Series 8 finale "Death in Heaven" (2014) and the 2015 episodes "The Magician's Apprentice",  "The Zygon Invasion" and "The Zygon Inversion". She also began headlining the audio drama spin-off UNIT: The New Series for Big Finish Productions alongside Ingrid Oliver as Osgood, whom Redgrave appeared on-screen with in Doctor Who. Redgrave also played Kate in a promo video for Doctor Who: Time Fracture, an immersive experience that began running in London in April 2021 before returning to the main programme from Series 13 onwards.

In March 2023, Russell T Davies announced a new spinoff series centered around UNIT and starring Redgrave.

Personal life
Redgrave married Tim Owen, a barrister at Matrix Chambers, in 1992. They had a son, Gabriel, in 1994. The couple separated from 1997 to October 1998. They reconciled, however, and had another son, Alfie, in 2000. They divorced in 2020.

Filmography

Film

Television

Theatre credits

Theatre

References

External links

https://www.conwayvangeldergrant.com/sites/default/files/cv/Jemma%20Redgrave%20Theatrical%20CV.pdf
"Jemma Redgrave: 'Grief is like a tsunami'", Kate Kellaway, The Guardian, 11 July 2010
"My Perfect Weekend: Jemma Redgrave", The Telegraph, 31 May 2008
 I Was Terrified of Being on my Own, The Telegraph, 2001

1965 births
Living people
Actresses from London
Alumni of the London Academy of Music and Dramatic Art
Audiobook narrators
English film actresses
English stage actresses
English television actresses
English Shakespearean actresses
English voice actresses
20th-century English actresses
21st-century English actresses
English anti–Iraq War activists
Redgrave family